Christian Halvorsen Svenkerud (25 August 1798 – 2 April 1886) was a Norwegian politician.

He hailed from Solør.

He was elected to the Norwegian Parliament in 1839, 1842, 1848 and 1851, representing the rural constituency of Hedemarkens Amt (today named Hedmark). He worked as a farmer.

References

1796 births
1886 deaths
Members of the Storting
Hedmark politicians